John "Jack" Marshall Lee (born September 2, 1950) is an American mathematician and professor at the University of Washington specializing in differential geometry.

Education
Lee graduated from Princeton University with a bachelor's degree in 1972, then became a systems programmer (at Texas Instruments from 1972 to 1974 and at the Geophysical Fluid Dynamics Laboratory in 1974–1975) and a teacher at Wooster School in Danbury, Connecticut in 1975–1977. He continued his studies at Tufts University in 1977–1978. He received his doctorate from Massachusetts Institute of Technology in 1982 under the direction of Richard Melrose with the dissertation Higher asymptotics of the complex Monge-Ampère equation and geometry of CR manifolds.

Career
From 1982 to 1987, Lee was an assistant professor at Harvard University. At the University of Washington he became in 1987 an assistant professor, in 1989 an associate professor, and in 1996 a full professor.

Research
Lee's research has focused on the Yamabe problem, geometry of and analysis on CR manifolds, and differential geometry questions of general relativity (such as the constraint equations in the initial value problem of Einstein equations and existence of Einstein metrics on manifolds).

Lee created a mathematical software package named Ricci for performing tensor calculations in differential geometry. Ricci, named in honor of Gregorio Ricci-Curbastro and completed in 1992, consists of 7000 lines of Mathematica code. It was chosen for inclusion in the MathSource library of Mathematica packages supported by Wolfram Research.

Awards
In 2012, Lee received, jointly with David Jerison, the Stefan Bergman Prize from the American Mathematical Society.

Selected publications

Textbooks 

  
 Riemannian Manifolds: An Introduction to Curvature, Springer-Verlag, Graduate Texts in Mathematics 1997
 (formally, the second edition of the above text)
 Introduction to Topological Manifolds, Springer-Verlag, Graduate Texts in Mathematics 2000, 2nd edition 2011
  
 Introduction to Smooth Manifolds, Springer-Verlag, Graduate Texts in Mathematics, 2002, 2nd edition 2012
 Fredholm Operators and Einstein Metrics on Conformally Compact Manifolds. American Mathematical Soc. 2006 
 Axiomatic Geometry, AMS 2013

References

External links
 Homepage

20th-century American mathematicians
21st-century American mathematicians
Princeton University alumni
Massachusetts Institute of Technology alumni
University of Washington faculty
Differential geometers
1950 births
Living people